Chrystal Rose is best known as a British television personality who presented the short-lived talk show The Chrystal Rose Show, produced by Carlton Television and broadcast on ITV from 1993 to 1994. She is also the mother of Louise Rose who was in the short-lived band Precious who competed in the 1999 Eurovision Song Contest.

Biography 

In 1984 Chrystal won 3rd place in a Channel 4 screenplay writing competition with her original script, “The Fine Edge of Friendship”.

Chrystal’s first novel, “What a Bitch”, was published in 1996 by Fourth Estate.

Her background is in television where she worked as a Producer and TV Presenter. In 1990 she funded her own pilots and created a talk show commissioned and aired on Carlton TV. “The Chrystal Show” ran for four series alongside “Chrystal’s Style Guide” a series which helped people look good for less.

Chrystal was a Director of Spotlight Promotions, producing major public events, exhibitions, concerts and managed budgets upwards of £500,000, writing business plans and forecasts. She has owned a clothing boutique in Central London and has a line of clothes and accessories on her own label.
 
Chrystal has written the novel, “40 Faking Fabulous” and the book, “How To Make A Film”, which follows her progress of getting “40 Faking Fabulous” from novel to the big screen.

She has headed negotiations in licensing agreements with British and American companies

Her game, “Flash & Furious” retails in stores throughout the US including Target.

Chrystal wrote the lyrics for the original songs on the sound track for “40 Faking Fabulous”.

References

British television personalities
British television presenters
Living people
British television talk show hosts
Black British television personalities
English people of Saint Lucian descent
Year of birth missing (living people)